Mesoderm development LRP chaperone, or MESD, is a protein that in humans is encoded by the MESD gene.

References

Further reading